The following is a list of events affecting American television in 2019. Events listed include television show debuts, finales, and cancellations; channel launches, closures, and re-brandings; stations changing or adding their network affiliations; and information about controversies and carriage disputes.

Notable events

January

February

March

April

May

June

July

August

September

October

November

December

Awards

Television shows

Shows debuting in 2019

Shows changing networks

Milestone episodes and anniversaries

Shows returning in 2019

The following shows will return with new episodes after being canceled or ended their run previously:

Shows ending in 2019

Entering syndication in 2019
A list of programs (current or canceled) that have accumulated enough episodes (between 65 and 100) or seasons (three or more) to be eligible for off-network syndication and/or basic cable runs.

Networks, services, and television stations

Deaths

References

External links
List of 2019 American television series at IMDb

 
American television